José Manuel García Luena (born 4 December 1974) is a footballer who plays for FC Encamp as a defender. Born in Spain, he has represented Andorra internationally.

National team statistics

References

 
 

1974 births
Living people
Footballers from San Sebastián
Spanish footballers
Spanish emigrants to Andorra
FC Andorra players
FC Rànger's players
FC Santa Coloma players
Segunda División B players
Tercera División players
Andorran footballers
Andorra international footballers
Association football fullbacks
Naturalised citizens of Andorra
Primera Divisió players